"Secrets" was the second single by Grinspoon which was released from their second studio album Easy. It was released in January 2000 on the Grudge label (the Australian imprint of Universal Records), reaching No. 83 on the Australian Singles Chart and polling at No. 73 on Triple J's Hottest 100 for 2000.

The song is played in dropped B tuning and is counted by fans as their best song from the Easy album. The video shows Phil Jamieson, who suffered a breakup, planning to rob a pawn shop. Two versions were made for the video, with one showing the band members shooting guns in the beginning.

Track listing

References

2000 singles
Grinspoon songs
1999 songs
Songs written by Phil Jamieson
Universal Records singles
Songs written by Pat Davern